William Arthur Ward (December 17, 1921 – March 30, 1994) was an American motivational writer.

More than 100 articles, poems and meditations written by Ward were published in such magazines as Reader's Digest, The Phi Delta Kappan, Science of Mind, and various Christian publications. His column “Pertinent Proverbs” was published by the Fort Worth Star-Telegram and also in American service club publications. He was a frequently quoted writer in Quote, an international weekly digest for public speakers.

A graduate of McMurry College, he received his master's degree at Oklahoma State University but did not complete his doctoral work at the University of Texas and at North Texas State University. In 1962 he was awarded an honorary Oklahoma City University degree in recognition of his “professional achievement, literary contributions and service to others.”

Ward was an assistant to the president of Texas Wesleyan College in Fort Worth beginning in 1955. In addition to his professional responsibilities, he was for two years the director of Methodist men for the Methodist Central Texas Conference, and for four years he taught the 140-member Sigler Bible Class at Polytechnic Methodist Church, where he also served as Sunday School superintendent and a church lay leader.

He was a professional member of the American College Public Relations Association, the International Platform Association, the Religious Public Relations Council and Phi Delta Kappa. In Fort Worth he was on the board of directors of numerous organizations, including Rotary, American Red Cross and Boy Scouts of America.

His biography appears in Who's Who in American Education, Who's Who in Public Relations, and Who's Who in the South and Southwest.

Works
Fountains of Faith, 
For This One Hour, ASIN B000OKBF82
Thoughts of a Christian Optimist ASIN B00POEXA5O
Prayer Is

References

External links 

 William Arthur Ward official web site

1921 births
1994 deaths
20th-century American male writers
20th-century American non-fiction writers
American male non-fiction writers
American motivational writers
McMurry University alumni
Oklahoma State University alumni
Texas Wesleyan University
University of North Texas alumni
University of Texas at Austin alumni